Zagreb Holding is a city enterprise from Zagreb, Croatia.

It was established in 2006, according to the Companies Act and it is 100-percent owned by City of Zagreb.

Zagreb Holding was created by transferring business equities in 21 companies, previously owned by City of Zagreb, to the Gradsko komunalno gospodarstvo d.o.o., which assumed the role of the holding company. In 2007 the company changed its name to Zagreb holding ltd. In the years that followed, Zagreb holding went through several other status changes and transformed into a company consisting of connected companies and institutions that are Zagreb holding. The group consists of Zagreb Holding company with 14 branches, 8 connected companies and 1 institution that manages all the Zagreb's above and below-ground infrastructure.

Zagreb holding's main task is to efficiently and permanently carry out public services in the city of Zagreb, with maximum consideration of public interest and the local community.

Zagreb holding activities 

Taking into account number and type of services offered, Zagreb Holding is a unique company in Croatia.

Primarily, it offers public services in the City of Zagreb.

It covers the following business areas:

 municipal services
 water supply and drainage services
 pharmacy services
 gas distribution and production of energy from renewables
 market services.

Municipal services, among other things, includes regular maintenance of 114 hectares of green areas, 2589 kilometers of unclassified roads, daily cleaning and maintenance of public areas, maintenance of public drainage channels, maintenance of 28 cemeteries and crematoriums, as well as public areas that are closed to traffic. It also provides services of public stations, public farmer's markets, parking services on public areas and in public garages, distribution of telecommunication channeling and other communal infrastructure services in the city of Zagreb. The group also maintains public passages, underpasses, fountains, and public toilets, as well as services one of the Zagreb's symbols - Grič cannon.

Market services include managing and maintenance of buildings and sports' facilities, construction, organization of travel and vacation for children, catering and tourism services, logistics, storage of goods, parking of cargo vehicles and Zagreb's Free Zone services, outdoor advertising and wholesale market services. Market services also include waste management, waste collection from citizens, as well as maintenance, protection, managing, reconstruction and development of regional and local roads, and other public transport areas.

Water supply and drainage services include collection, purification and distribution of water, drainage services and construction and maintenance of water supply and drainage networks.

Within the Group there are companies for energy services: they offer gas distribution services and production of energy from renewable sources.

Special activity is a production and distribution of pharmaceuticals, children's food, cosmetics and other health care, with integrated galenic and analytic labs.

History 
Zagreb Holding was established in 2006, but the history of its services goes back to the second half of the 19th century, when the first utilities' companies were established in Zagreb. Condition of communal infrastructure is the most important indicator of development in any city, and Zagreb's state of communal affairs shows that the city is part of European capitals for more than 100 years.

First Zagreb's utilities' company that was established was Plinara - in 1862. Other of Zagreb's utilities' companies were established in the first half of the 20th century. Rapid growth of the city and the city infrastructure, as well as a rapid rise in population, forced city administration to establish other utilities' and communal companies.

Zagreb Holding, established in 2006, was in charge of expanding and improvement of communal and utilities services. At the time, it was known as Gradsko komunalno gospodarstvo d.o.o. In 2007 the company changes its name into Zagreb Holding ltd.

Mission 
To efficiently provide utilities' and other services, using responsible corporate business practices.

Vision 
To become synonymous with organized and healthy living in Zagreb, and to be known as an example of excellence in public services, as well as the initiator of business development in Zagreb and Croatia.

Branches, companies and institutions 

Arena Zagreb

Centar ltd

References

External links 
  

Companies based in Zagreb
Public utilities established in 2007
2007 establishments in Croatia